Qlipso Inc. is an Israeli-American technology company, which builds and operates multi-user content-sharing platforms for Flash-based media. The company's social-viewing platform provided users the ability to view and share various forms of media with others, live or asynchronously.

Since 2010, the company holds the assets of the online video portal Veoh. In May 2012, Qlipso launched a new personal social video sharing platform, called Mixin, which allows users to  find their friends' favorite videos, interact with them on the video itself, and discover the trending videos online in a personalized matter. The platform gained more than 200,000 users in the first days after the official launch.

Acquisition of Veoh
On April 8, 2010, it was announced that Qlipso had acquired substantially all of the assets of online video portal Veoh, which in 2008 had approximately 17 million unique visitors monthly. Qlipso used the acquisition to add a broad and established base of users, along with revenue, to its content-sharing service, while integrating its social-viewing features into Veoh's mainstream online video platform.

Management and Funding
Qlipso is led by an international team of established video game and digital media industry veterans. Qlipso was founded in September 2007 by Ishay Pnueli, a veteran of the video game and technology industries. Jon Goldman, who previously founded and served as CEO of the video game development company Foundation 9 Entertainment, joined Qlipso as CEO in early 2009. Qlipso was incubated and funded by Jerusalem Venture Partners and now headquartered in Los Angeles, California, with additional offices in New York City and Jerusalem, Israel.

References

External links
 Qlipso.com
 Veoh.com
 Mixin.com
 Qlipso Blog
 Interview with Jon Goldman, CEO of Qlipso, in Billboard Magazine
 Jon Goldman byline on Mashable.com about future of online video

Video hosting
Video on demand services
Online companies of Israel
Companies based in Los Angeles